Nividic Lighthouse (Phare de Nividic) is one of five major lighthouses on Ouessant island in Brittany. The others are the Phare du Créac'h, the Stiff lighthouse (from Breton Stiv), Kéréon and La Jument. Built in 1912, the Phare de Nividic was the first automatic lighthouse in the world. It has been a listed monument since 2017.

See also

 List of lighthouses in France

References

Nividic
Ushant